Sarju railway station is a railway station on Lucknow–Gorakhpur line under the Lucknow NER railway division of North Eastern Railway zone. This is situated at Kuri, Sarju in Gonda district in the Indian state of Uttar Pradesh.

References

Railway stations in Gonda district
Lucknow NER railway division